The Governor of Punjab is the appointed head of state of the provincial government in Punjab, Pakistan. Although the Governor is the head of the province on paper, it is largely a ceremonial position; and the main powers lie with the Chief Minister Punjab and Chief Secretary Punjab.

However, throughout the history of Pakistan, the powers of the provincial governors were vastly increased, when the provincial assemblies were dissolved and the administrative role came under direct control of the governors, as in the cases of martial laws of 1958–1972 and 1977–1985, and governor rules of 1999–2002. In the case of Punjab, there was direct governor rule in 1949–1951, when the provincial chief minister of that time was removed and assemblies dissolved.

List of governors

Governors of West Pakistan

Punjab Province

See also
 Chief Minister of Punjab
 Senior Minister of Punjab (Pakistan)
Leader of the Opposition Punjab
Speaker of the Provincial Assembly of Punjab
 Government of Punjab
 Provincial Assembly of the Punjab
 List of Governors of Pakistan
 List of Chief Ministers in Pakistan

References

Governors of Pakistani provinces
Governors of Punjab, Pakistan
Lists of political office-holders in Pakistan